Crockey Hill is a small village in the unitary authority of City of York in North Yorkshire, England.

The village is in the Wheldrake ward of the City of York.

Businesses located at Crockey Hill include a car dealership, a veterinary surgery, a transport cafe and a fruit and vegetable stall.  The York Designer Outlet is also nearby, situated at the intersection of the A19 and the A64, approximately 1 mile north of the village.

The A19 at Crockey Hill was a notorious blackspot with many people becoming injured or losing their lives in road traffic accidents. This led to traffic lights being installed at the junction linking the A19 to Wheldrake Lane in 2007. The traffic lights have not proved entirely effective.

References

Villages in the City of York